Pradip Shumsher J.B.R. is a former chief of Nepal Police, who served as the IGP from September 1999 to December 2001. He was preceded by Achyut Krishna Kharel and was succeeded by Shyam Bhakta Thapa as the police chief. During his tenure as police chief, he had introduced Mahendra Police Swimming Complex, which cost a budget of Rs. 7 crores. The Royal Palace Massacre (2001) had also occurred during his tenure as police chief.

References

Living people
Nepalese police officers
Inspectors General of Police (Nepal)
Year of birth missing (living people)
People of the Nepalese Civil War